William Louiron (born March 13, 1978 in Ancenis) is a French former professional footballer. He currently is the assistant manager of Ligue 2 club for Quevilly-Rouen.

Louiron played at the professional level in Ligue 2 for Angers SCO, Grenoble Foot 38 and Stade Reims.

1978 births
Living people
French footballers
Ligue 2 players
Angers SCO players
Grenoble Foot 38 players
Stade de Reims players
US Boulogne players
FC Rouen players
Association football defenders